Christopher Thomas Youlden (born 1 January 1943, Dagenham, England) is an English blues singer. He worked with the British blues band Savoy Brown from 1967 until 1970. He has since released several solo albums.

His albums with Savoy Brown are "Getting To The Point" (1968), "Blue Matter" (1969), "A Step Further" (1969), and "Raw Sienna" (1970). Chris was not only the vocalist and played piano, but wrote many of their songs, including  six out of nine songs from Raw Sienna, which remains their most popular album.

Solo discography
Nowhere Road (1973) – London Spectrum Generic CD 3694 01 Remaster 2003 (Canada)
City Child (1974) – London Spectrum Generic CD 3693 03 Remaster 2003 (Canada)
Legend (1979) – London
Second Sight (1991) – Ruf Records, Line Records
Matico/Chris Youlden & The Big Picture (2006) – Midnight Records/Littlehorn CD

References

External links
Illustrated Chris Youlden discography

1943 births
Living people
English blues musicians
English blues singers
People from Dagenham
Savoy Brown members
Ruf Records artists